Nikos Christodoulides (born 6 December 1973) is a Cypriot politician, former diplomat and academic who has served as the eighth president of Cyprus since 2023. He was previously Minister of Foreign Affairs from 2018 to 2022, and Spokesman of the Cypriot Government from 2014 to 2018. 

For much of his career, Christodoulides worked as a diplomat. In 2003, he received a PhD in political science from the University of Athens, and was a lecturer and researcher at the University of Cyprus between 2007 and 2010. Afterwards, he served in various roles in the second Anastasiades government, including as Minister of Foreign Affairs.

In January 2022, he resigned from his post as Minister to run as an Independent in the 2023 Cypriot presidential election with the backing of centrist and right-of-centre parties. He was subsequently endorsed by the Democratic Party (DIKO), Movement for Social Democracy (EDEK), Democratic Alignment (DIPA) and Solidarity Movement parties.

In the 2023 Cypriot presidential election, he won 32.04% of the popular vote in the first round and 51.92% in the second round, thus becoming president-elect. Christodoulides took office on 28 February 2023, becoming the first president born in an independent Cyprus.

Early life 
Born in 1973 at Geroskipou, Paphos, to a Greek Cypriot family, Christodoulides' father hailed from the village of Choulou in Paphos' mountainous region, whilst his mother's family came from Geroskipou.

Education 
Educated at the Archbishop Makarios III Lyceum in Paphos, he left in 1991, to study at Queens College, City University of New York, graduating with a bachelor's degree in economics and Byzantine & Modern Greek studies, before pursuing further studies in political science at New York University (MA) and in diplomatic studies at the Mediterranean Academy of Diplomatic Studies (MEDAC), University of Malta (MA).

Christodoulides earned a PhD in political science and public administration from the University of Athens in 2003.

Career before presidency

Diplomat 

Christodoulides entered diplomatic service in 1999, before joining government in 2013. He held various posts including Director of the Office of the Minister of Foreign Affairs of the Republic of Cyprus, Spokesman of the Cyprus Presidency to the Council of the European Union in Brussels, Deputy Chief of Mission at the Embassy of Cyprus to Greece, Director of the Office of the Permanent Secretary of the Ministry of Foreign Affairs, and Consul-General of the High Commission of the Republic of Cyprus to the United Kingdom.

University and government appointments 

Christodoulides lectured and served as a research associate in the Department of History and Archeology at the University of Cyprus; a Special Scholar, he taught on the "History of the Postwar World".

Between 2013 and 2018, he served as Director of the Diplomatic Office of the President of the Republic of Cyprus, and as Government Spokesman between 2014 and 2018.

Minister of Foreign Affairs 

On 1 March 2018, Christodoulidis was appointed to the Cabinet as Minister of Foreign Affairs, after the re-election of President Nicos Anastasiades.

On 6 March 2018, Christodoulidis stated that Nicosia would not be swayed by Turkey's incursions into the Exclusive Economic Zone of Cyprus. During a meeting on Greek-Cypriot cooperation with Greek Prime Minister Alexis Tsipras, he said that the "number one goal is the reunification of the country."

In May 2018, Christodoulidis officially asked the United Nations to prepare for a speedy resumption of the reunification process. After meeting Greek Foreign Minister Nikos Kotzias on 7 May 2018, he praised Secretary-General António Guterres for despatching a UN Special Representative to sound out the atmosphere for resuming talks.

In June 2018, Christodoulidis visited Israel and met with Prime Minister Benjamin Netanyahu and President Reuven Rivlin. They discussed regional developments and the strengthening of bilateral ties in energy and emergency situations. They also discussed Turkish incursions and strategic cooperation on the planned EastMed pipeline.

In June 2018, Christodoulidis welcomed an announcement by ExxonMobil executives to speed up their schedule to begin drilling operations in Block 10 of the Exclusive Economic Zone. Operations, planned to begin in the fourth quarter of 2018, commenced in 2021.

On 17 July 2018, Christodoulidis met EU High Representative Federica Mogherini in Brussels. They discussed the potential role of the EU in resuming stalled peace talks with Turkey. During his visit, Christodoulidis stated that Cyprus does "not have the luxury of a new talks' failure" and that "Turkey has to comply with European standards and international law."

On 15 July 2020, he commented on the 2020 Armenian–Azerbaijani clashes, condemning the "ceasefire violation by Azerbaijan" and calling for "restraint of the parties to de-escalate the tension in the region".

A Knight of the Holy Sepulchre since 2018, Christodoulidis was awarded the Order of the Serbian Flag on 5 April 2021 by President Aleksandar Vučić.

Presidency
After months of speculation on whether he would run in the 2023 Cypriot presidential election, Christodoulidis expressed his interest at a press conference held at the Ministry of Foreign Affairs on 9 January. The next day, he resigned as Minister and was replaced by veteran politician Ioannis Kasoulides on 11 January 2022.

In June 2022, he formally announced his candidacy as an independent candidate, despite being a member of the DISY. He was endorsed by DIKO and EDEK, respectively the island's third and fourth-largest parties. On 5 January 2023, following the filing of his candidacy, he was formally ejected from DISY by the party's governing body. A July 2022 opinion poll said he appeared to maintain a comfortable lead over the other candidates.

He won the first round of the presidential election with 32.04% of votes, and was thereafter backed by incumbent President Anastasiades. After winning the second round with 51.92% of the vote, against the 48.08% of Andreas Mavroyiannis who was supported by the Progressive Party of Working People (AKEL), Christodoulidis was declared pesident-elect. 

Christodoulides was inaugurated as president on 28 February 2023, succeeding Nicos Anastasiades. Christodoulides declared that his prime focus was finding a solution to the Cyprus problem.

Personal life 
Christodoulidis is married to Philippa Karsera, a Greek Cypriot diplomat from Dora. They met in 1999, when newly appointed diplomatic attachés in the Ministry of Foreign Affairs. She served at the Cypriot High Commission in London, then at the Embassy in Athens and the Permanent Representation of Cyprus to the European Union in Brussels, before being promoted Deputy Director of the President's Diplomatic Office at the Presidential Palace, Nicosia. Styled Minister Plenipotentiary, from February 2022, she led the crisis management directorate in the Cyprus Ministry of Foreign Affairs.

The couple have four children together.

Publications 
Christodoulidis has contributed to many domestic and international academic journals, and is the author of two books: Plans for Solution of the Cyprus Problem 1948–1978 published in 2009, and Relations between Athens and Nicosia and the Cyprus Problem 1977–1988 published in 2013.

Honours and awards
 : Grand Cross of the Order of Merit of the Republic of Poland (2021)
 : Order of the Serbian Flag (4 May 2021)
 : Grand Collar of the Order of the Redeemer (13 March 2023)

References 

1973 births
Living people
People from Paphos District
Candidates for President of Cyprus
Cypriot diplomats
Cyprus Ministers of Foreign Affairs
Greek Cypriot politicians
Greek Cypriot people
New York University alumni
Queens College, City University of New York alumni
University of Cyprus alumni
University of Malta alumni
Presidents of Cyprus